Gagea divaricata is an Asian species of plants in the lily family, native to Kazakhstan, Kyrgyzstan, Tajikistan, Uzbekistan, and Xinjiang Province of western China.

Gagea divaricata is a bulb-forming perennial up to 5 cm tall. Flowers are yellow with a green stripe on the backside of each tepal.

References

External links
Plantarium, Gagea divaricata Regel (семейство Liliaceae) Гусиный лук растопыренный color photo; captions and links in Russian

divaricata
Flora of Asia
Plants described in 1879